Edwin Goodall CBE FRCP (1863 - 29 November 1944) was a British physician and president of the History of Medicine Society of the Royal Society of Medicine from 1935 to 1937.

References 

Presidents of the History of Medicine Society
1863 births
1944 deaths
Fellows of the Royal College of Physicians
Commanders of the Order of the British Empire